Samuel Patrick Robert Long (born 16 January 1995) is an English professional footballer who plays as a defender for Oxford United.

Career
Long began his career with Oxford United and made his professional debut on 27 April 2013 as a late substitute in a 3–0 victory over Accrington Stanley on the last day of the 2012–13 season. His first starting appearance was in a 1–1 draw with Morecambe in League Two on 22 February 2014.

On 20 November 2014, he joined Kidderminster Harriers on loan as part of a deal that saw Chey Dunkley going the other direction. Following his return to Oxford, he scored his first goal, in a 2–3 home defeat against Southend United in EFL League Two on 17 January 2015. Injuries limited his appearances in 2015–16 and 2016–17, although his contract with Oxford was extended by a year in March 2017. He was loaned to Hampton and Richmond Borough in January 2018, a loan that was later extended. Despite not having played a first-team fixture for Oxford in 2017–18, he signed a new one-year contract in June 2018.
Already the club's longest-serving player, having joined the club as an 8-year-old, in June 2020 he signed a two-year extension with Oxford United. In April 2021, Long signed a further three-year deal with the club. He was voted both the Players' and Supporters Player of the Season at the end of the 2020–21 season.

Career statistics

References

External links

1995 births
Living people
People from Bicester
English footballers
Oxford United F.C. players
Kidderminster Harriers F.C. players
Hampton & Richmond Borough F.C. players
English Football League players
National League (English football) players
Association football defenders